Liantonghe railway station is a station launched in 2006. on the Chinese Qingzang Railway.

See also

 Qingzang Railway
 List of stations on Qingzang railway

References

Railway stations in Tibet
Stations on the Qinghai–Tibet Railway